Fakhireh may refer to:
 Fakhireh-ye Olya
 Fakhireh-ye Sofla